William Carrick Braly (November 15, 1841 – December 25, 1920) was an American politician. He was a member of the Arkansas House of Representatives, serving from 1877 to 1880 and from 1883 to 1885. He was a member of the Democratic party.

References

1920 deaths
Speakers of the Arkansas House of Representatives
Democratic Party members of the Arkansas House of Representatives
1841 births
People from Washington County, Arkansas
People from Franklin County, Missouri
19th-century American politicians